Stuart Ellis Storey (born 16 September 1942) is a British sports commentator and former 110m hurdler.

Early life
Storey was born in Louth, Lincolnshire. He grew up in Holbeach, later helping to coach local resident Geoff Capes at Holbeach Athletics Club. He was educated at Spalding Grammar School. At Loughborough Training College (became Loughborough College of Education in 1963, then part of the University in 1977) he qualified as a teacher of Physical Education and mathematics. He went on to represent Great Britain at the 1968 Summer Olympics.

He represented England in the 110 meters hurdles, at the 1970 British Commonwealth Games in Edinburgh, Scotland.

He held the British record at the 200m hurdles.  On retiring from the sport, he joined Thames Polytechnic (now part of the University of Greenwich) where he held the post of Director of Physical Education for 16 years until 1989.

Commentator
After retiring from competition he became an athletics broadcaster on the BBC and since 1973 he has commentated on nine Olympic Games from 1976-2008. He also was the BBC's regular basketball and squash commentator during the 1970s and 1980s.

He left the BBC after the 2008 Olympic Games in Beijing.

He later worked as a freelance commentator for Nova International for their Great Run series of road races, for IMG Sweden on the world feed of the IAAF Diamond League athletics meetings and for the host broadcasting services for the 2012 Olympic Games in London and 2014 Commonwealth Games in Glasgow. He provided commentary at the Sochi winter Olympics for a number of broadcasters.  He finally hung up his microphone after the Diamond League meeting in Brussels on 1 September 2017.

Stuart also provided commentary for a number of Olympic video games include Sydney 2000, Salt Lake 2002 and Athens 2004.

Mr. Stuart Storey retired from commentating near the end of the 2017, after 44 years of work. An article was published in Athletics Weekly about his experiences at the time of the announcement of his retirement. He said that his favorite moment commentating was in 2012 London Olympic games where he was the lead commentator for the track events along with Peter Matthews.

Rugby Union
In 2001, he became a part-time commercial manager of Neath RFC, as his son James played for the team. His Loughborough-educated son (born 26 November 1976) played for London Welsh RFC, Neath the Ospreys and Munster.  James is the former captain and then head coach of Hertford RFC First XV, a role he left at the end of the 2015/2016 season.

References

1942 births
Living people
People from Holbeach
People from Louth, Lincolnshire
British sports broadcasters
Alumni of Loughborough University
British male hurdlers
People educated at Spalding Grammar School
BBC sports presenters and reporters
Athletes (track and field) at the 1968 Summer Olympics
Athletes (track and field) at the 1970 British Commonwealth Games
Olympic athletes of Great Britain
Commonwealth Games competitors for England